Stuart William Naylor (born 6 December 1962) is an English professional football coach and former player.

Early life
Naylor was born in Wetherby, West Riding of Yorkshire.

Playing career
Naylor had a trial with Leeds United in 1977, but did not sign for the club and the following year joined Yorkshire Amateur. He signed schoolboy forms with Lincoln City in February 1979 before turning professional in June 1980. During his time at Lincoln he spent time on loan at Kettering Town, Peterborough United and Crewe Alexandra. In February 1986 he moved to West Bromwich Albion for a £110,000 transfer fee. He also played for Bristol City, Mansfield Town (on loan), Exeter City and Rushden & Diamonds, as well as winning three caps for the England B team. In May 1985 he was to witness a nightmare when 56 spectators were killed in a horrendous stand fire while playing for Lincoln against Bradford City.

Coaching career
At the end of his playing career, Naylor moved into coaching, joining Rushden & Diamonds permanently as a goalkeeping coach and back-up goalkeeper on 14 June 2000. Naylor would make a final Football Conference appearance as a substitute, following the sending-off of Billy Turley, in the 3–2 away defeat to Doncaster Rovers on 11 November 2000 with his final first team game being a 2–0 Football League Trophy defeat away to Barnet on 28 November 2000. In March 2004 Rushden's manager Brian Talbot departed for Oldham Athletic and Naylor swiftly followed him, becoming goalkeeping coach for the Boundary Park based club. In July 2005 he moved as goalkeeping coach to Bristol City.
In March 2013, Naylor moved to Bristol Rovers as a full-time goalkeeper coach up until the end of the 2012–13 season. His contract was extended in May 2013.

References

External links

BBC - Did you see Sky Blues sink Baggies?
Career stats at Soccerbase
Lincoln City F.C. Official Archive Profile
Rushden & Diamonds F.C. Official Profile
Unofficial Stuart Naylor Profile at The Forgotten Imp

1962 births
Living people
People from Wetherby
English footballers
Association football goalkeepers
England B international footballers
English Football League players
Yorkshire Amateur A.F.C. players
Lincoln City F.C. players
Peterborough United F.C. players
Crewe Alexandra F.C. players
West Bromwich Albion F.C. players
Bristol City F.C. players
Mansfield Town F.C. players
Exeter City F.C. players
Rushden & Diamonds F.C. players
English football managers
Oldham Athletic A.F.C. non-playing staff
Bristol City F.C. non-playing staff
Bristol Rovers F.C. non-playing staff